In music, Op. 83 stands for Opus number 83. Compositions that are assigned this number include:

 Brahms – Piano Concerto No. 2
 Elgar – String Quartet
 Glazunov – Symphony No. 8
 Prokofiev – Piano Sonata No. 7
 Ries – Violin Sonata No. 19
 Saint-Saëns – Havanaise
 Schumann – 3 Gesänge
 Shostakovich – String Quartet No. 4
 Sibelius – Jedermann